Jacob M. Appel (born February 21, 1973) is an American author, poet, bioethicist, physician, lawyer and social critic. He is best known for his short stories, his work as a playwright, and his writing in the fields of reproductive ethics, organ donation, neuroethics, and euthanasia. Appel's novel The Man Who Wouldn't Stand Up won the Dundee International Book Prize in 2012. He is the director of Ethics Education in Psychiatry and an associate professor of psychiatry and medical education at the Mount Sinai School of Medicine, and he practices emergency psychiatry at the adjoining Mount Sinai Health System. Appel is the subject of the 2019 documentary film Jacob by director Jon Stahl.

Appel coined the term "whitecoat washing" to refer to nations using medical collaboration to distract from human rights abuses.

Education
Appel was born in the Bronx to Gerald B. Appel and Alice Appel and raised in Scarsdale, New York, and Branford, Connecticut. His family is Jewish. He completed his Bachelor of Arts at Brown University with double majors in English and American literature and in history (1995). He has seven master's degrees from:

 Brown University (Master of Arts in European history, 1996) 
 Columbia University (Master of Arts in American history, 1998, and Master of Philosophy in American history, 2000) 
 New York University (Master of Fine Arts in creative writing with a focus in fiction, 2000) 
 Albany Medical College, constituent of the Union University of New York (Master of Science in bioethics, 2012)
 Queens College of the City University of New York (Master of Fine Arts in playwriting, 2013)
 Mount Sinai School of Medicine (Master of Public Health, 2014)

He holds a Juris Doctor from Harvard Law School (2003) and a Doctor of Medicine from the Columbia University College of Physicians and Surgeons (2009). He completed his medical residency in clinical psychiatry and medical fellowship in psychosomatic medicine at the Mount Sinai School of Medicine. He is also licensed to practice law in New York and Rhode Island. He was working on a PhD in the history of American medicine and psychiatry from Columbia University as of May 2012.

Fiction writer and playwright

Appel is a "prolific" short story writer.

His fiction has been published in  literary journals, including Agni, The Alaska Quarterly Review, The Gettysburg Review, The Missouri Review, Shenandoah, StorySouth and Virginia Quarterly Review.

His first story collection, Scouting for the Reaper, won Black Lawrence Press's Hudson Prize in 2012. Among the other awards he has won for his short stories are those sponsored by the Boston Review (1998) and New Millennium Writings (2004, 2007, 2008).

He won the William Faulkner-William Wisdom Award for best short story in 2004 and a Sherwood Anderson Foundation grant in 2005. His fiction has been short-listed for the O. Henry Prize (2001), Best American Short Stories (2007, 2008, 2013), Best American Nonrequired Reading (2006, 2007), Best American Mystery Stories (2009) and the Pushcart Prize (2006, 2007, 2011, 2014, 2019).

His debut novel The Man Who Wouldn't Stand Up won the 2012 Dundee International Book Prize and was published by Cargo in October 2012. It was described as "A darkly comic satire, full of insight into American culture" by Stephen Fry and "engaging, funny, ingenious, even charming" by Philip Pullman. His book subsequently won The International Rubery Book Award in 2013.

His plays have been performed by companies across the U.S., including the Detroit Repertory Theatre, Heller Theatre, and Epilogue Players.

Appel has taught creative writing at the Gotham Writers' Workshop and New York University. He served as writer-in-residence at Yeshiva College in 2013.

Bioethicist

Academic bioethics
As a professional bioethicist, Appel has published in Hastings Center Report, The Cambridge Quarterly of Healthcare Ethics, Bulletin of the History of Medicine, The Journal of Law, Medicine and Ethics, The Journal of Medical Ethics, The Journal of Bioethical Inquiry and GeneWatch, the journal of the Council for Responsible Genetics. He is the author of a "Bioethics in Action" curriculum for The New York Times.

Appel is an advocate for the decriminalization of assisted suicide, raising the possibility that this might be made available to both the terminally ill and those with intractable, long-term mental illness. He has also defended the Groningen Protocol. He has written in favor of abortion rights and fertility treatment for homosexuals, as well as against electronic medical records, which he sees as poorly secured against hacking. He has also argued in favor of the legalization of prostitution, polygamy and incest between consenting adults. He has raised concerns regarding the possibility that employers will require their employees to use pharmaceuticals for cognitive enhancement and has urged that death row inmates be eligible to receive kidney transplants. He generated considerable controversy for endorsing the mandatory use of preimplantation genetic diagnosis as part of the in vitro fertilization process to prevent the implantation of embryos carrying severe genetic defects. Appel has also written in support of an "open border" immigration policy. Among the causes that Appel has embraced is opposition to the forcible feeding of hunger strikers, both in domestic prisons and at Guantanamo Bay. He has written that exposure to literature should be a medical school admissions requirement.

He has taught medical ethics at New York University, Columbia University, Mount Sinai School of Medicine and Brown University's Alpert Medical School.

Commentary
Appel writes for both The Huffington Post and Opposing Views. He has staked out a libertarian position on many bioethical issues, advocating a worldview that he describes as "a culture of liberty." He has written opinion pieces in The New York Times, New York Daily News, New York Post, Chicago Tribune, Orlando Sentinel, Albany Times-Union, Tucson Citizen, Detroit Free Press, New Haven Register, Baltimore Sun and The Providence Journal. The Best American Essays series named his nonfiction pieces as "notable essays" in the years 2011, 2012, 2013, 2015 and 2017, and received "special mention" from the Pushcart Prize in 2012 and 2017.

Plays
 The Resurrection of Dismas and Gestas (2005)
 In the Floodplain (2005)
 Arborophilia (2006)
 The Three Belles of Eden (2006)
 Thirds (2007)
 The Mistress of Wholesome (2007)
 The Replacement (2008)
 Woodpecker (2008)
 Causa Mortis (2009)
 Helen of Sparta (2009)

Books
 The Man Who Wouldn't Stand Up (Cargo, 2012)
 The Biology of Luck (Elephant Rock, 2013)
 Scouting for the Reaper (Black Lawrence, 2014)
 Phoning Home (University of South Carolina Press, 2014)
 Einstein's Beach House (Pressgang/Butler University, 2014)
 The Magic Laundry (Snake Nation, 2015)
 Miracles and Conundrums of the Secondary Planets (Black Lawrence, 2015)
 Wedding Wipeout (Cozy Cat Press, 2013)
 The Topless Widow of Herkimer Street (Howling Bird Press/Augsburg College, 2016)
 Coulrophobia & Fata Morgana (Black Lawrence, 2016)
 The Mask of Sanity (Permanent Press, 2017)
 The Liars' Asylum (Black Lawrence Press, 2017)
 Millard Salter's Last Day (Gallery Books, 2017)
 The Amazing Mr. Morality (Vandalia Press/West Virginia University, 2018)
 The Cynic in Extremis: Poems (Able Muse, 2018)
 Amazing Things Are Happening Here (Black Lawrence, 2019)
 Surrendering Appomattox (C&R, 2019)
 Who Says You're Dead? (Algonquin, 2019)
 Winter Honeymoon (Black Lawrence, 2020)
 Shaving with Occam (Press Americana, 2022)

References

External links

 Appel's Biography at his website

1973 births
21st-century American dramatists and playwrights
21st-century American essayists
21st-century American historians
21st-century American novelists
21st-century American short story writers
Albany Medical College alumni
American columnists
American human rights activists
American male dramatists and playwrights
American male essayists
American male novelists
American male short story writers
American medical historians
American medical writers
American abortion-rights activists
Bioethicists
Brown University alumni
Brown University faculty
Columbia University Vagelos College of Physicians and Surgeons alumni
Euthanasia activists
Harvard Law School alumni
Icahn School of Medicine at Mount Sinai faculty
Jewish American historians
Jewish American novelists
American LGBT rights activists
Living people
Medical ethicists
Icahn School of Medicine at Mount Sinai alumni
New York University Grossman School of Medicine faculty
People from Branford, Connecticut
People from Scarsdale, New York
Queens College, City University of New York alumni
Scarsdale High School alumni
Utilitarians
American Book Award winners
21st-century American male writers
Novelists from New York (state)
Historians from New York (state)
HuffPost bloggers
Columbia Graduate School of Arts and Sciences alumni
Historians from Connecticut